AMV is an Australian television station licensed to, and serving the regions surrounding Wagga Wagga and Albury-Wodonga in south western New South Wales and north eastern Victoria. The station was, for many years, merged with RVN-2 as the Riverina and North East Victoria Television Service.

History

Origins
AMV-4 commenced broadcasting on 7 September 1964. It broadcast programming from the three commercial stations in Sydney (ATN-7, TCN-9 and TEN-10) alongside local programming including coverage of the Albury Gold Cup, the Ovens and Murray Football League Grand Final and the 1988 Miss Australia pageant. The station has continuously produced a half-hour regional news program on weeknights, currently known as Prime7 News, with local news and sports reports produced in Albury but aired in bulletins put together at Prime7's Canberra headquarters.

Prior to going on air
When the commercial television license for the Riverina area was being determined, a number of local groups submitted proposals. Young-based radio station 2LF, along with local councils and businesses in the Young-Cootamundra area, Wagga Wagga newspaper The Daily Advertiser and radio station 2WG, together with local Wagga Wagga businessmen, as well as a group of smaller newspapers and some licensed clubs.

2LF's proposal later joined forces with the Advertiser/2WG bid - 2LF would get 10% of the shares, 2WG got 20% and The Advertiser got 15%, with the remaining shares to be offered to local people. After issues at the Australian Broadcasting Control Board enquiry for the license, the 2LF/2WG/Advertiser group (trading as Riverina Television) won the license.

The initial board was made up representatives from 2WG, 2LF, The Daily Advertiser, and two local councils. A few days after the license was announced, the chairman and station manager had a disagreement, resulting in the resignation of both. They were replaced by Wal Hucker, who ran a film animation and sound company in Sydney, and was also the former chairman's brother-in-law. The former chairman's wife also joined the board, as the Control Board made it clear that 2WG had to remain involved in the station. Bill Marsden, of 2LF, became the station manager.

A disagreement with Wagga Wagga council over the location of a potential studio site, which would have provided direct line of sight transmission to the Mount Ulandra transmitter, saw a new site rezoned from residential areas.

As with most stations launching at that time, the mast would be shared with the local transmitter of the ABC, but not the transmitting facilities, as chief engineer Stuart McDonald wanted to operate the facilities remotely. RVN would be first station to operate their transmitters in this way. The studios were completed in early 1964.

Early broadcasting
AMV-4 Albury opened transmission for the first time at 5:00pm on 7 September 1964. The opening night's programming included an announcement from the area's then local Federal Member, footage of the station's construction, an episode of I Love Lucy and the feature film, The Dambusters. The station closed down for the night at 10:00pm

As with most stations at the time, news was done by announcing over slides, or read to the camera, combined with the previous night's news film from ATN-7 Sydney. Local programming, including commercials, was broadcast live. RVN was the only station to have made a profit, albeit a small one, in its first year of operation.

RVN-AMV
By the early 1970s, many regional stations faced financial difficulties, and as a result RVN and AMV merged to form the Riverina and North East Victoria Television Service Pty Ltd, in 1971. The stations were known on-air as RVN-AMV. Both stations were programmed separately, until 1976 when transmission for both stations was centralised in Wagga Wagga.

In 1983, the stations faced a unique situation when New South Wales and Victoria ended daylight saving periods at different times. For three weeks, RVN's output was shown on AMV on a one-hour delay. It was also unusual in that it served audiences in two states, and had to program accordingly. New South Wales viewers in the Riverina received Sydney news and sports, primarily rugby league, while viewers in North East Victoria were shown Melbourne news and sports (mainly VFL/AFL).

By the mid-1980s, 80 people were employed at Wagga, and a further 40 in Albury. RVN-AMV was purchased by Paul Ramsay's Ramcorp Ltd. in 1987, and merged with the MidState Television network, forming Prime Television. RVN and AMV split up in 1989, when Southern New South Wales was aggregated - RVN joined with CBN, as the Seven Network affiliate in the area in competition with Ten Capital and WIN Television. AMV, meanwhile expanded into the rest of Victoria as the state's Seven Network affiliate, in competition with Vic TV and Southern Cross.

RVN's callsign ceased to exist in 1991, when the Wagga Wagga and Orange licenses were merged to become only CBN. At the same time, AMV moved from VHF channel 4 to VHF channel 11, in order to allow FM stations to be established without interference from existing television stations (using VHF channels 3, 4, 5 and 5A).

In preparation for aggregation of the Victorian market - (excluding Mildura) - in early 1992, a studio facility and playout centre was constructed in the Ballarat suburb of Mitchell Park.  At that time this facility was the playout centre for the Western Victoria, Central Victoria, and Gippsland regions. Playout for the Albury and Shepparton regions was maintained at Prime's Albury studios. The Ballarat centre was and continues to be operated under the AMV licence.

Seven News 
AMV produces and broadcasts a 30-minute Seven News bulletin for the Albury-Wodonga border and North East Victoria regional market each weeknight at 6:00pm co-presented by Madelaine Collignon and Elly Wicks in Canberra introducing news and sports reports from Seven's Albury-based reporters. Kirstie Fitzpatrick is the bulletin's weather presenter. The bulletin is followed by a shortened 30-minute version of Seven News Melbourne at 6:30pm. The new news arrangement followed the launch of Seven News @ 6:30 on 24 February 2014. Albury is in NSW, just over the border from the Victorian city of Wodonga. AMV takes its programs from Seven Melbourne under the Victoria broadcast market, with Albury much closer to Melbourne than it is to Sydney.

Throughout the station's history, local news under various names were produced and broadcast from studios at 570 Union Road in Lavington in Albury's north. In the 2000s Prime became closing most of its regional studios, citing upgrade costs. Albury however was not cut and in late 2010 was upgraded to digital equipment. However, just two months after the upgrade, Seven announced it would be closing its Albury studios and transferring production to Canberra, and thus the last bulletin was produced in February 2011. The studios were converted to a church several years later, however the last local news presenter, Helen Ballard, moved to the newly-established newsroom in Albury as a reporter.

In the Ballarat, Bendigo and Gippsland regional markets, two-minute updates are presented by Phoebe Deas, with weather forecasts from Daniel Gibson.

Main Transmitters

Notes:
1. HAAT estimated from http://www.itu.int/SRTM3/ using EHAAT.
2. The Upper Murray station was on VHF channel 4 from its 1964 sign-on until 1991, moving to its current channel in order to accommodate FM radio.
3. Analogue transmissions ceased as of 5 May 2011 as part of the conversion to digital television

Prime Media Group
Seven Network
Television stations in New South Wales
Television channels and stations established in 1964
1964 establishments in Australia